These are the songs that reached number one on the Top 50 Best Sellers chart in 1954 as published by Cash Box magazine.

See also
1954 in music
List of number-one singles of 1954 (U.S.)

References
http://www.cashboxmagazine.com/archives/50s_files/1954.html

1954
1954 record charts
1954 in American music